Anique Poitras (May 22, 1961 – December 19, 2016) was an award-winning writer in Quebec, Canada, whose work was aimed mostly at adolescent readers.

She was born in L'Épiphanie and lived there until the age of 13. Poitras received a bachelor's degree in literary studies from the Université du Québec à Montréal.

The books in the Sara trilogy each received a Prix Livromanie in 1993, 1994 and 1998. The two-volume La Chambre d'Éden, the last book in the trilogy, was a finalist for the Mr. Christie's Book Awards. She participated in many book fairs and public readings and also held writing workshops. She lectured on creative writing at the University of Laval.

Poitras died on December 19, 2016 at the age of 55.

Selected works 
 Sara trilogy: La Lumière blanche (1993), La Deuxième Vie (1994), La Chambre d'Éden, two volumes (1998)
 Roman de Sara, novel (2000)
 Isidor Suzor, novel (2002), received the Prix Chronos Vacances
 La Chute du corbeau, novel (2003), received second prize in the Mr. Christie's Book Awards and the Prix international du Salon du livre de Québec

References 

1961 births
2016 deaths
Writers from Quebec
Canadian women poets
Canadian poets in French
Canadian women novelists
Canadian novelists in French
Université du Québec à Montréal alumni
20th-century Canadian poets
20th-century Canadian novelists
20th-century Canadian women writers
21st-century Canadian novelists
21st-century Canadian poets
21st-century Canadian women writers
Academic staff of Université Laval